A Dynkin system, named after Eugene Dynkin is a collection of subsets of another universal set  satisfying a set of axioms weaker than those of -algebra.  Dynkin systems are sometimes referred to as -systems (Dynkin himself used this term) or d-system. These set families have applications in measure theory and probability.

A major application of -systems is the - theorem, see below.

Definition

Then  is a Dynkin system if
 
  is closed under complements of subsets in supersets: if  and  then 
  is closed under countable increasing unions: if  is an increasing sequence of sets in  then 

It is easy to check that any Dynkin system  satisfies:
 is closed under complements in : if  then 
 Taking  shows that 
 To be clear, this property also holds for finite sequences  of pairwise disjoint sets (by letting  for all ).

Conversely, it is easy to check that a family of sets that satisfy conditions 4-6 is a Dynkin class.
For this reason, a small group of authors have adopted conditions 4-6 to define a Dynkin system as they are easier to verify.

An important fact is that any Dynkin system that is also a -system (that is, closed under finite intersections) is a -algebra. This can be verified by noting that conditions 2 and 3 together with closure under finite intersections imply closure under finite unions, which in turn implies closure under countable unions.

Given any collection  of subsets of  there exists a unique Dynkin system denoted  which is minimal with respect to containing  That is, if  is any Dynkin system containing  then   is called the  
For instance,  

Sierpiński–Dynkin's π-λ theorem

Sierpiński-Dynkin's - theorem:

One application of Sierpiński-Dynkin's - theorem is the uniqueness of a measure that evaluates the length of an interval (known as the Lebesgue measure):

Let  be the unit interval [0,1] with the Lebesgue measure on Borel sets. Let  be another measure on  satisfying  and let  be the family of sets  such that   Let  and observe that  is closed under finite intersections, that  and that  is the -algebra generated by   It may be shown that  satisfies the above conditions for a Dynkin-system.

Application to probability distributions

See also

Notes

Proofs

References

 
 
 

Families of sets
Lemmas
Probability theory